Sains-en-Amiénois is a commune in the Somme department in Hauts-de-France in northern France.

Geography
The population has increased two-fold in the last 30 years, as people of the region have left the land to work in or around Amiens.

Population

Places of interest
 The 15th-century church, which is dedicated to three saints (Fuscien, Victoric and Gentien), whose joint tomb is a feature inside the building. Around 1900 the tower was topped with a spire. The church also houses a 12th-century font and sculptures from the 13th and 18th centuries, originally from the abbey at Selincourt, now a part of the commune of Hornoy-le-Bourg.

See also
Communes of the Somme department

References

External links

 Official municipal website 
 Sains-en-Amiénois, photos and historical notes 

Communes of Somme (department)